The Sweden men's national under-18 ice hockey team or Småkronorna (Small Crowns in Swedish) is the men's national under-18 ice hockey team of Sweden. The team is controlled by the Swedish Ice Hockey Association, a member of the International Ice Hockey Federation. The team represents Sweden at the IIHF World U18 Championships and the Hlinka Gretzky Cup. Sweden won its first gold medal in 2019.

International competitions

IIHF European U18/U19 Championships
  

1967 (unofficial):  3rd place
1968:  Bronze
1969:  Silver
1970:  Bronze
1971:  Silver
1972:  Gold
1973:  Silver
1974:  Gold
1975:  Bronze
1976:  Silver
1977:  Gold
1978:  Bronze
1979: 4th place
1980:  Bronze
1981:  Bronze
1982:  Gold

1983: 4th place
1984:  Bronze
1985:  Gold
1986:  Silver
1987:  Gold
1988: 4th place
1989: 4th place
1990:  Gold
1991: 4th place
1992:  Silver
1993:  Gold
1994:  Gold
1995:  Bronze
1996:  Bronze
1997:  Silver
1998:  Gold

IIHF World U18 Championships

1999:  Silver
2000:  Bronze
2001: 7th place
2002: 9th place
2003: 5th place
2004: 5th place
2005:  Bronze
2006: 6th place
2007:  Bronze
2008: 4th place

2009: 5th place
2010:  Silver
2011:  Silver
2012:  Silver
2013: 5th place
2014: 4th place
2015: 8th place
2016:  Silver
2017: 4th place
2018:  Bronze
2019:  Gold
2021:  Bronze
2022:  Gold

External links
 Team Sweden all time scoring leaders in IIHF U18 World Championships
Sweden at IIHF.com

I
National under-18 ice hockey teams